Kwiecień is a Polish surname which means "April". Notable people with the surname include:
 Anna Kwiecień (born 1964), Polish politician
 Bartosz Kwiecień (born 1994), Polish footballer
 Konrad Kwiecień (born 1964), Polish archer
 Mariusz Kwiecień (born 1972), Polish opera singer
 Michał Kwiecień (born 1957), Polish bridge player

See also
 
 Kwiecień (film), a 1961 Polish film

Polish-language surnames